Sztutowo  (formerly ) is a village in Nowy Dwór Gdański County, within the Pomeranian Voivodeship of northern Poland. It is located about 38 km (24 mi) east of Gdańsk on the northeastern edge of the Vistula Delta, at the base of the Vistula Spit on the Baltic coast.

At the beginning of World War II, the Nazi Germans established the Stutthof concentration camp in the town, which soon developed into a huge complex of 40 subcamps across numerous locations, with as many as 100,000 people incarcerated there from all of German-occupied Europe, and more than 85,000 victims.

History 
Sztutowo has been known since the beginning of the 13th century as a fishing settlement in the Eastern Pomeranian (Pomerelian) region. It was part of medieval fragmented Poland, before it was conquered by the Teutonic Knights in 1308. It was located on a day's journey from Gdańsk on the Hanseatic post road to Königsberg. A coaching inn and stud farm were founded in 1432 to provide refreshment and fresh horses for the coaches, and the settlement developed into a village.

In 1454, Polish King Casimir IV Jagiellon signed the act of reincorporation of the region to the Kingdom of Poland, and as a result the Thirteen Years' War broke out. It ended in a Polish victory in 1466, when the Teutonic Knights renounced any claims to the region, and recognized it as part of Poland. Afterwards, the village was a possession of the city of Gdańsk, administratively located in the Pomeranian Voivodeship in the province of Royal Prussia in the larger Greater Poland Province of the Kingdom of Poland. At that time an estate and manor were founded in Sztutowo, and an agrarian settlement developed nearby. It is recorded that Tsar Peter the Great of Russia stayed in Sztutowo in 1716. The village was annexed by King Frederick the Great of Prussia in 1772 during the First Partition of Poland. A later lessee of the manor was the father of the German pessimist philosopher, Arthur Schopenhauer, who spent the first five years of his life there (born 1788 in Gdańsk).

As Stutthof, the village became part of the German Empire upon the Prussian-led unification of Germany in 1871. After the defeat of Imperial Germany in World War I, the village became part of the territory of the Free City of Danzig in accordance with the terms of the 1919 Treaty of Versailles.

World War II 

At the beginning of World War II in 1939, the Nazis built the Stutthof concentration camp nearby, which received its first prisoners on 2 September that year. The village was annexed to Nazi Germany. The camp eventually developed into a huge complex with branches throughout northern Poland by the time it was liberated in May 1945 by the Red Army. More than 110,000 persons of twenty-five nationalities from nineteen countries were imprisoned, and it is estimated that more than 85,000 of them perished here. After the war, the village was reintegrated with Poland. The site of the former Stutthof camp, located to the west of the current village, is now a Polish national museum.

Economy 

Sztutowo is an agricultural, fishing, and tourist center, with numerous guest houses, spas, campgrounds, and recreational facilities. It has numerous seaside activities and a close proximity to a Polish national nature preserve and bird sanctuary.

Sports 
Hemako Sztutowo professional beach soccer team is based in Sztutowo.

References

External links 
 Stutthof National Museum

Villages in Nowy Dwór Gdański County
Holocaust locations in Poland